André Blanc was a physiotherapist who became manager of Olympique de Marseille for the 1942–43 season. He won the Coupe de France in this season.

Notes and references 

French football managers
Olympique de Marseille managers
Date of birth unknown
Date of death unknown
Year of death missing